Ambrose Clark may refer to:

F. Ambrose Clark (1880–1964), American equestrian
Ambrose W. Clark (1810–1887), U.S. Representative from New York